The 1890 Minnesota Golden Gophers football team represented the University of Minnesota as an independent in the 1890 college football season. It was the only season under head coach Tom Eck and featured the historic first meeting between Minnesota and Wisconsin, the most-played rivalry at the top level of NCAA college football. The two teams have played each other every year since then except for 1906. That game was canceled by President Theodore Roosevelt who had decided to "cool off heated college football rivalries because of injuries and deaths on the field." The game was a decisive 63–0 Minnesota win.

Coach Eck started holding signal drills before each game and established a training table. This is considered to be the start of "scientific football" at Minnesota. He also acted as the team's trainer.

The game was a hard fought 18–13 Minnesota victory.

The Ariel declared this team to be the "champions of the northwest".

Schedule

Roster
Horace R. Robinson (captain), William C. Leary, George K. Belden, J.A. Harris, S.S. Start, Grant B. Rossman, Eugene L. Patterson, William C. Muir, George C. Sikes, Alf F. Pillsbury, Harry E. White, Charles E. Guthrie, James E. Madigan, David R. Burbank, Everhard P. Harding; Trainer Tom Eck.

References

Minnesota
Minnesota Golden Gophers football seasons
Minnesota Golden Gophers football